Patrick McCaffery (born March 20, 2000) is an American college basketball player for the Iowa Hawkeyes of the Big Ten Conference.

Early life and high school
McCaffery was born in Greensboro, North Carolina where his father, Fran McCaffery was the head basketball coach at UNC Greensboro and spent his early childhood there until moving to Albany, New York after Fran became the head coach at Siena. He moved with his family to Iowa City, Iowa at age ten when his father was named the head coach at the University of Iowa. McCaffery was diagnosed with thyroid cancer when he was 13 years old. He was diagnosed cancer free after three months of treatment, including two surguries. 

McCaffery attended Iowa City West High School and made the varsity basketball team as a freshman. He was named first team All-State after winning the 2017 4A State Championship 19.9 points and six rebounds per game in his junior season. McCaffery repeated as a first team All-State selection after averaging 25.1 points and 7.6 rebounds per game. He also set Iowa City West's scoring record during his senior season. McCaffery was rated a consensus top-100 prospect and committed to play for his father at Iowa.

College career
McCaffery played in two games as a freshman before missing the rest of the season after encountering complications from his cancer treatment. He ultimately was granted a hardship waiver by the NCAA and allowed to use a redshirt on the season. He played in all 31 of the Hawkeyes games as a redshirt freshman and averaged 5.2 points and 2.7 rebounds per game. McCaffery became a starter and averaged 10.5 points and 3.6 rebounds as a redshirt sophomore.

McCaffery started the first 14 games of his redshirt junior season before taking a leave of absence from the team, citing the need to address his mental health. He returned to the team after a six-game leave of absence.

Personal life
McCaffery's father, Fran McCaffery, played college basketball at Wake Forest and Penn before entering coaching. His mother, Margaret, played basketball at Notre Dame and was an All-American. His brother Connor also plays basketball for Iowa. While undergoing treatment for cancer McCaffery became close friends with NBA star Chris Paul.

References

External links
Iowa Hawkeyes bio
USA Basketball bio

2000 births
Living people
American men's basketball players
Basketball players from Iowa
Sportspeople from Iowa City, Iowa
Iowa Hawkeyes men's basketball players
Power forwards (basketball)